Walsall Manor Hospital is an acute general hospital in Walsall, West Midlands managed by the Walsall Healthcare NHS Trust.

History

The hospital has its origins in an infirmary built for the Central Union Workhouse in 1896; the car park is on the site of Walsall Castle, a 12th/13th-15th century moated manor house. After becoming the Manor Hospital in 1928, it expanded through conversion for clinical use of an old nurses' block in the 1930s and of an old recreational hall in the 1960s. A new geriatric block was opened in 1973 and the West Wing was opened by Princess Diana in 1991.

A redevelopment of the site was procured under a Private Finance Initiative contract in 2007. The works, which were designed by Steffian Bradley and carried out by Skanska at a cost of £174 million, were completed in 2010.

A new "dementia friendly" ward opened in May 2015 and a transitional care unit for new-born babies opened at the hospital in February 2017.

Construction of a new Emergency Department has received funding, with Interserve awarded the contract to construct the new department. The work is expected to start in April 2020, and the new department is scheduled to open in 2022.

See also
 Walsall Integrated Sexual Health Services
 Healthcare in West Midlands
 List of hospitals in England

References

External links
 Walsall Healthcare NHS Trust

Buildings and structures in Walsall
NHS hospitals in England
Hospitals in the West Midlands (county)
Poor law infirmaries